Uncharacterized LOC100505912 is a protein that in humans is encoded by the LOC100505912 gene.

References